Geert Lambert (born 28 February 1967) is a Belgian politician and lawyer. He was the president of Spirit, a Flemish political party, from 2004 until 2007, when he was succeeded by Bettina Geysen. In 2003 he became a member of the Chamber of Representatives, where he headed the Spirit fraction, and following the 2007 Belgian federal election held on 10 June 2007, he became a directly elected member of the Belgian Senate.

Notes

1967 births
Living people
Sociaal-Liberale Partij politicians
Members of the Belgian Federal Parliament
Politicians from Ostend
Flemish lawyers